KMFA FM 89.5 is a non-profit, listener-supported, classical radio station licensed in Austin, Texas. Currently under ownership of Capitol Broadcasting Association, Inc, KMFA serves 100,000 listeners. The broadcast schedule consists of playlists announced by local hosts, as well as nationally syndicated broadcasts, including those from the Metropolitan Opera during its season. On the weekends, the NPR program From the Top, showcasing young classical musicians, is heard on KMFA, as well as a program of classical music from the School of Music at the University of Texas-Austin.

KMFA is licensed to broadcast a digital hybrid HD signal.

Hosts
 Emilio Alvarez
 Jeffrey Blair
 Guillermo Delgado
 Dianne Donovan
 Ryan Kelly
 Judlyne Lilly-Gibson
 Carla McElhaney
 Anton Nel
 Sara Schneider

References

External links
Official website

MFA
Classical music radio stations in the United States
Texas classical music
Radio stations established in 1967